Wasim Gulzar Khan  (born 26 February 1971) is a former British cricketer who was the first British-Pakistani player to play professional cricket in England. He was a left-handed batsman who also bowled right arm medium pace.

Khan's family, originally from the Pakistan Occupied Kashmir region, relocated to England in the 1960s. Khan was born in Birmingham and attended Somerville Primary School before continuing on to Oldknow Secondary School. At the age of 12, he began to display a talent for cricket, and was encouraged to play by a teacher. Later that year in 1983, he was selected for the Warwickshire Under 13s team. Khan was the only state school boy in that team.

He played first-class cricket for the record-breaking double-winning Warwickshire team in 1995, averaging 49 in the championship winning team. He also gained a NatWest winners medal. He represented England in the Under 19s.

Khan was seen as one of the most important men in English cricket, leading the Cricket Foundation's £50 million Chance to Shine campaign as the CEO. The campaign aimed to regenerate competitive cricket in state schools. Prior to this, he was Operations Director for the Cricket Foundation's campaign - Chance to Shine. His autobiography Brim Full of Passion was voted Wisden Book of the Year 2007. Since launching in 2005, Chance to Shine has reached over 1.8 million children across 6,500 schools and has raised close to £40 million. He also sits on the Equality and Human Rights Commission Sports Group, The Prince's Trust Cricket Group, and has the Anti-Corruption and Security Unit of the England and Wales Cricket Board. In January 2015, he earned a Master of Business Administration from the Warwick Business School.

He was made a Member of the Order of the British Empire (MBE) in the 2013 Birthday Honours for services to cricket and the community.

In October 2014, he was made Chief Executive of the Leicestershire County Cricket Club.

In December 2018, he was appointed as the managing director of the Pakistan Cricket Board (PCB) and moved to Pakistan to take his office in February 2019. In September 2021, he resigned as PCB chief executive four months before the end of his contract.

In April 2022, Khan was appointed International Cricket Council's General Manager of cricket.

References

External links
 

1971 births
Living people
Alumni of Warwick Business School
British sportspeople of Pakistani descent
Cricketers from Birmingham, West Midlands
Derbyshire cricketers
English cricketers
English cricketers of 1969 to 2000
English cricketers of the 21st century
English expatriates in Pakistan
English people of Mirpuri descent
Members of the Order of the British Empire
British Asian cricketers
Sussex cricketers
Warwickshire cricketers
Warwickshire Cricket Board cricketers